John Payne (9 November 1860 – 14 January 1928) was a member of the Queensland Legislative Assembly.

Biography
Payne was born in Goulburn, New South Wales, the son of William Payne and his wife Mary (née Brogham). He was educated at state and private Schools in New South Wales. He came to Queensland in 1882 where he worked as a shearer, and general bush worker and in 1885 opened a blacksmith and wheelwright business at Arrilalah, which lasted about a year. He went back to shearing until 1890 and the next year held an important position on the Second Strike Committee and later that year opened another blacksmith and wheelwright business in Longreach which he operated for four years.

On 2 July 1892 Payne married Elizabeth Catherine Ahern (died 1924) and together had three sons and six daughters. He died at the Ingarfield Private Hospital in Brisbane in January 1928 and after a service at Corpus Christi Catholic Church at Nundah his body was shipped by train to Longreach for his burial.

Public life
Having previously been an organiser for the Amalgamated Workers' Union, Payne, a member of the Labour Party, won the 1905 by-election for the seat of Mitchell, to replace the previous member, Arthur Cooper who had returned to England. He went on to represent the seat until his death in 1928.

References

Members of the Queensland Legislative Assembly
1860 births
1928 deaths
Australian Labor Party members of the Parliament of Queensland